Gro Espeseth (born 30 October 1972) is a former Norwegian footballer, world champion and olympic champion.

She played for the clubs Sandviken and Trondheims-Ørn, debuted for the Norwegian national team in 1991, and played 105 matches for the national team.

She received a bronze medal at the 1996 Summer Olympics in Atlanta, and a gold medal at the 2000 Summer Olympics in Sydney.

Club career 
With Sandviken Espeseth won the 1995 Norwegian Women's Cup, scoring twice in the 3–2 final win over Trondheims-Ørn, including the extra time winner. She had an offer to join Japanese L. League club Suzuyo Shimizu F.C. Lovely Ladies, but the transfer fell through when she failed the medical.

Espeseth signed for the professional Women's United Soccer Association (WUSA) ahead of the inaugural season in 2001. She was allocated to New York Power alongside compatriot Ann Kristin Aarønes. Knee damage meant that she was only able to play for one season before retiring.

In 2007 Espeseth returned to football as an assistant coach with her former club Sandviken. Due to the unavailability of several players, she made a guest appearance as a player in July 2007, six years after her retirement. She was substituted after 40 minutes of Sandviken's Toppserien 9–0 defeat by Røa IL.

Honours

Olympics
Atlanta 1996 - Bronze
Sydney 2000 - Gold

FIFA Women's World Cup
1991 FIFA World Cup in China - Silver
1995 FIFA World Cup in Sweden - Gold

Personal life
Espeseth gave birth to son Brage in 2002.

References

External links
 

 Profile at Women's United Soccer Association (New York Power)

1972 births
Living people
Norwegian women's footballers
Footballers at the 1996 Summer Olympics
Footballers at the 2000 Summer Olympics
Olympic footballers of Norway
Olympic gold medalists for Norway
Olympic bronze medalists for Norway
FIFA Century Club
Olympic medalists in football
Norway women's international footballers
1991 FIFA Women's World Cup players
1995 FIFA Women's World Cup players
Toppserien players
SK Brann Kvinner players
SK Trondheims-Ørn players
New York Power players
Women's United Soccer Association players
FIFA Women's World Cup-winning players
Expatriate women's soccer players in the United States
Norwegian expatriate women's footballers
Norwegian expatriate sportspeople in the United States
FIFA Women's World Cup-winning captains
Medalists at the 2000 Summer Olympics
Medalists at the 1996 Summer Olympics
Women's association football defenders
UEFA Women's Championship-winning players
People from Stord
Sportspeople from Vestland